HMS Eclipse was a 4-gun Cormorant-class first class gunvessel launched in 1860 from the shipyard of J. Scott Russell & Co., Millwall. She served on the Australia Station, took part in the Second Taranaki War, including contributing men to a naval brigade which attacked the Maori stronghold at Gate Pā. The entire class were never satisfactory as gunvessels, partly due to their excessive draught, and Eclipse was broken up at Sheerness in 1867, only 7 years after her launch.

Design

Propulsion
The first 6 ships, including Eclipse, had a 2-cylinder horizontal single-expansion steam engine provided by Robert Napier and Sons and rated at 200 nominal horsepower, driving a single screw.

Armament
The main armament, which was principally intended for shore bombardment, was originally designed with two 68-pounder and two 32-pounder muzzle-loading smoothbore guns. They were finished, however, with a single 7-inch/110-pounder Armstrong breech-loading gun and a 68-pounder muzzle-loading smoothbore gun. A pair of broadside 20-pounder Armstrong breech-loading guns were also fitted. The 68-pounders were later replaced by a pair of 64-pounder muzzle-loading rifled guns.

Sail plan
In common with all other Royal Navy wooden screw gunvessels, the Cormorants were rigged as barques, that is with three masts, with the fore and main masts square rigged, and the mizzen fore-and-aft rigged.

Construction
The first 6 ships were ordered on 14 June 1859 from commercial yards, with Eclipse built by J Scott Russell at Millwall. Since gunvessels were intended to work in shallow water while bombarding the shore, work on the later two batches was suspended, with 3 of the 7 suspended ships later completed as survey vessels and the rest cancelled. Eclipse was launched on 18 September 1860.

Service
On 16 October 1862, she collided with the merchant ship Louise in the English Channel off Beachy Head, Sussex. Louise was abandoned; her crew were rescued by HMS Eclipse. Louise survived the encounter, and was taken in to Ramsgate, Kent the next day.
She was sent to Australia Station in 1863 under the command of Commander Richard Charles Mayne. Afterwards she was sent back to Australian waters. She towed the New Zealand colonial government river paddle-steamer Pioneer across the Tasman Sea on her delivery voyage from Sydney on 22 September and arriving at Onehunga, New Zealand on 3 October 1863. During the voyage the two ships collided and Eclipses bow was stoved-in.

In October 1863, Commander Mayne led a naval brigade of 200 seamen which captured Merrimi and later fortified the town. On 20 November a naval brigade of 400 men, under Commander Mayne participated in the battle of Rangiriri during the invasion of Waikato, where five seamen were killed and 10 wounded, including Commander Mayne who was invalided home. Coming under the command of Commander Edmund Fremantle, she took part in the capture of Waikato in January 1864, and contributed to a naval brigade which defeated the Maoris at Rangiawahia. Again on 29 April 1864 she contributed to a naval brigade which attacked the Maori stronghold at Gate Pā. On 1 September 1864, Eclipse ran aground at Tauranga, New Zealand. She ran aground again on 20 October at Wellington. A Court of Enquiry blamed on of her officers on each occasion.

On 13 July 1865, she was driven ashore on the coast of Australia. Repairs cost £3,337. A Court Martial censured several of her officers. In September 1865 the Eclipse was engaged in transporting militia from Whanganui to Opotiki as part of the East Cape War and in response to the Völkner Incident.

Fate
She left the Australia Station in mid-1866 and returned to Britain where she was paid off and broken up at Sheerness in 1867.

References

Bastock, John (1988), Ships on the Australia Station, Child & Associates Publishing Pty Ltd; Frenchs Forest, Australia. 

1860 ships
Ships built in Millwall
Cormorant-class gunvessels
Maritime incidents in September 1864
Maritime incidents in October 1864
Maritime incidents in July 1865